Peter Varley Haigh (28 July 1925 – 18 January 2001) was an English in-vision announcer for BBC Television in the years after the Second World War.

Born in North London, the son of an engineer, he was educated at Aldenham School, Aldenham, Hertfordshire. He was commissioned in 1944 into the 5th Battalion, the Welsh Guards. He served in Palestine and Egypt, and joined the British Forces Broadcasting Service in Jerusalem. He later helped start up the BBC Overseas News station in Mombasa, Kenya.

After leaving the army, he failed to get a job as a BBC Radio announcer, but joined BBC Television as an announcer in March 1952 after a trial at Alexandra Palace, then the base of BBC Television. He joined the team of continuity announcers headed by McDonald Hobley and Sylvia Peters. He went on to present Come Dancing and Picture Parade, a film review programme in 1956 with co-presenter Derek Bond, the actor.

In 1958, he provided the BBC commentary for the Eurovision Song Contest, staged that year in Hilversum, Netherlands. He also provided the BBC radio commentary for the contest in 1962. He also presented a number of programmes on the BBC Light Programme including Movie-Go-Round on Sunday afternoons from 1956 to 1969.

Although he fitted well into the style of 1950s BBC Television, with the changing style of TV after the introduction of commercial television in 1955, his career declined, and his first marriage broke up. In 1957 he had married the 1950s film star Jill Adams. The couple had a daughter, Peta Louise.

From the early 1970s, he lived in Portugal running a restaurant and bar popular with British tourists, and met his German-born second wife, Inge. They returned to the UK in the 1980s but he could not resume his broadcasting career. He made a final television appearance as guest of Des Lynam on a series called It's My Pleasure. He later worked occasionally for BBC radio and did voice-overs for advertisements.

References

External links
 

1925 births
2001 deaths
BBC television presenters
British Army personnel of World War II
People educated at Aldenham School
Radio and television announcers
Welsh Guards officers
British expatriates in Portugal